Metro Junior Hockey League may refer to:

 Metro Junior A League, a Junior 'A' hockey league from 1961 to 1963 that operated in association with the Ontario Hockey Association 
 Metro Junior A Hockey League, a Junior 'A' hockey league from 1991 to 1998 that was later absorbed by the Ontario Provincial Junior A Hockey League

See also
 Metropolitan Junior Hockey League, an American Tier III Junior ice hockey league with teams in the eastern USA, renamed as North American 3 Atlantic Hockey League (NA3AHL) for the 2016–17 season